Vera Mattar  (born 1916) is an Lebanese former tennis player. She is the first Lebanese female tennis player to compete in the Grand Slam.

She played in Singles at the Wimbledon in 1948. She lost to the American Barbara Scofield in the Second Round. Her partner in mixed doubles Egyptian Eddie Mandelbaum lost in the Second Round to the Australian player John Bromwich and American Louise Brough. 

Competed in mixed doubles at Wimbledon in 1960 with her partner compatriot Karim Fawaz lost in the Second Round to the Mexican player Rafael Osuna and American Sally Moore.

Career finals

Singles (8–5)

Doubles (3–4)

References

1916 births
Lebanese tennis players
Year of death missing